CFTH-FM-1 is an English language community radio station that broadcasts on the frequency 97.7 MHz (FM) in Harrington Harbour, Quebec, Canada. CFTH is owned by Radio communautaire de Harrington Harbour.

History
The radio station originally dates back to 1985, when it was incorporated. It wasn't until January 21, 1991 that CFTH-FM began broadcasting over the airwaves.

On November 5, 2019, Radio communautaire de Harrington Harbour has requested to revoke its broadcast licence for CFTH-FM-1 Harrington Harbour and its transmitters CFTH-FM-2 Mutton Bay and CFTH-FM-3 Kegaska.

Transmitters

On October 14, 2010, the station applied to add a new FM transmitter at Mutton Bay in order to adequately serve the population of Mutton Bay and La Tabatière. The station received CRTC approval on December 6, 2010 and will operate on the frequency 98.5 MHz.

On July 25, 2016, the CRTC approved Radio communautaire de Harrington's application to operate a rebroadcasting transmitter in Kegaska. The new transmitter will operate at 89.9 MHz (channel 210LP) with an effective radiated power of 10 watts (non-directional antenna with an effective height above average terrain of 10 metres).

References

External links
www.cfthradio.com - CFTH Radio

Fth
Fth
Fth
Year of establishment missing
FTH-FM-1